David Downes is a British sociologist and criminologist and is Professor Emeritus of Social Administration at the London School of Economics.

Downes was one of the founder members of the National Deviancy Conference.

Publications

1960s-1980s

Downes, D. (1966) The Delinquent Solution, London: Routledge and Kegan Paul

Downes, D.M., Davies, B.P., David, M.E., Stone, P. (1976) Gambling, work and leisure: a study across three areas. London: Routledge & Kegan Paul

Downes, DM, (1988) Contrasts in Tolerance: Post-War Penal Policy in The Netherlands and England and Wales. Oxford: OUP, Clarendon

1990s

Downes, D. (1999) '"Toughing It Out": From Labour Opposition to Labour Government.' Policy Studies 19, no. 3-4 (1999), pp. 191–198.

Downes, D. (1999) 'Crime and Deviance.' In: Sociology: Issues and Debates. Ed Taylor, S. Palgrave Macmillan, 
 
Downes, D. (1999) 'The Role of Employment and Training in Reducing Recidivism (Plenary Address).' Reinsercao Social Ministry of Justice, Portugal

2000s

Downes, D. (2001) 'Four Years Hard: New Labour and Crime Control.' Criminal Justice Matters 46, Winter 2001
 
Downes, D. (2001) 'The "Macho" penal economy: Mass incarceration in the US - A European Perspective.' Punishment and Society 3, no. 1 (2001), pp. 61–80. 
 
Downes, D. (2001) 'The macho penal economy: Mass incarceration in the U.S. - a European perspective.' In: Mass Imprisonment: Social Causes and Consequences. Ed Garland, D. Sage,

Downes, D. & Rock, P. (2003) Understanding Deviance. 4th edition. Oxford University Press,

Downes, D. (2004) 'New Labour and the Lost Causes of Crime.' Criminal Justice Matters 55, Spring

Downes, D. (2006) 'Welfare and punishment in comparative perspective.' In: Perspectives on punishment: The contours of control. Ed Armstrong, S. & McAra, L. Oxford University Press,

Downes, D. & Morgan, R. (2006) 'No turning back: The politics of law and order into the millennium.' In; The Oxford Handbook of Criminology. 4th ed. Eds. Maguire, M., Morgan, R. & Reiner, R. Oxford University Press

Downes, D. & Morgan, R. (2002) 'The Skeletons in the Cupboard: The Politics of Law and Order at the Turn of the Millennium.' In: Oxford Handbook of Criminology. 3rd ed. Eds. Maguire, M., Morgan, R. & Reiner, R. Oxford University Press

References

External links
David Downes staff page at London School of Economics and Political Science

British sociologists
British criminologists
People educated at King Edward VII School, Sheffield
Living people
Year of birth missing (living people)
Academics of the London School of Economics